The Savage Woman is a 1918 American silent adventure film directed by Edmund Mortimer and Robert G. Vignola and starring Clara Kimball Young, Edward Kimball, and Milton Sills.

Cast
 Clara Kimball Young as Renee Benoit 
 Edward Kimball as Jacques Benoit 
 Milton Sills as Jean Lerier 
 Marcia Manon as Aimee Ducharme 
 Clyde Benson as Prince Menelek

Preservation
With no prints of The Savage Woman located in any film archives, it is a lost film.

References

Bibliography
 Monaco, James. The Encyclopedia of Film. Perigee Books, 1991.

External links

1918 films
1918 adventure films
American silent feature films
American adventure films
American black-and-white films
Films directed by Edmund Mortimer
Films directed by Robert G. Vignola
Selznick Pictures films
1910s English-language films
1910s American films
Silent adventure films